Ernest P. Bicknell (February 23, 1862 - 1935) was an important figure in the American Red Cross in the early part of the 20th century and Director General of the League of Red Cross Societies from 1926 to 1927.

References

1862 births
1935 deaths
American Red Cross personnel
Place of birth missing
Place of death missing
Date of death missing